Caledon (2021 population 76,581) is a town in the Regional Municipality of Peel in the Greater Toronto Area of Ontario, Canada. From a shortened form of Caledonia, the Roman name for North Britain; Caledon is a developing urban area, although it remains primarily rural. It consists of an amalgamation of a number of urban areas, villages, and hamlets; its major urban centre is Bolton on its eastern side adjacent to York Region.

Caledon is one of three municipalities of Peel Region. The town is at the northwest border of the city of Brampton.

History
By 1869, Belfountain was a Village with a population of 100 in the Township of Caledon County Peel. It was established on the Credit River. There were stagecoaches to Erin and Georgetown. The average price of land was $20.

In 1973, Caledon acquired more territory when Chinguacousy dissolved, with most sections north of Mayfield Road (excluding Snelgrove) transferred to the township.

Caledon inherited the name from Caledon Township of then Peel County, Ontario, in 1974, which was likely named by settlers, like Edward Ellis (who came from the area around Caledon, County Tyrone, in Northern Ireland) or by public voting.

Demographics 

In 2021, the median age was 40.8 years old, slightly lower than the provincial median at 41.6 years old. There are 24,795 private dwellings. According to the 2011 National Household Survey, the median value of a dwelling in Caledon is $474,087 which is significantly higher than the national average at $280,552. The median household income (after-taxes) in Caledon is $83,454, much higher than the national average at $54,089. The average individual's income is $53,870.

According to the 2021 Census, the largest five ethnic origins of the residents of Caledon are: Italian (17,630; 23.2%), English (10,320; 13.6%), Indian (9,120; 12.0%), Scottish (8,270; 10.9%), and Canadian (8,095; 10.6%). English is the mother tongue of 65.4% of the residents of Caledon. Native speakers of Punjabi make up 11.1% of the town's population, Italian 5.4%, Portuguese 1.4%, Spanish 1.3% and Polish 1.0%.

As of 2021, 58.5% of Caledon's population was Christian, down from 77.5% in 2011. 38.2% of residents were Catholic, 10.5% were Protestant, 6.0% were Christian n.o.s, 1.8% were Christian Orthodox and 2.0% belonged to other Christian denominations or Christian-related traditions. 19.3% of the population was non-religious or secular, up from 18.6% in 2011. All other religions and spiritual traditions accounted for 22.2% of the population, up from 3.9% in 2011. This included Sikhism (14.3%), Hinduism (4.7%), Islam (2.1%), Buddhism (0.5%) and Judaism (0.4%).  

66.3% of Caledon residents were white/European, 32.8% were visible minorities, and 0.8% were Indigenous. The largest visible minority groups were South Asian (21.4%), Black (3.6%), Latin American (1.7%), Chinese (1.0%) and Filipino (1.0%)

Government

 Mayor Annette Groves
 Councillor Ward 1 Lynn Kiernan
 Councillor Ward 2 Dave Sheen
 Councillor Ward 3 Doug Maskell
 Councillor Ward 4 Nick deBoer
 Councillor Ward 5 Tony Rosa
 Councillor Ward 6 Cosimo Napoli
and on Peel regional council by:
 Mayor  Annette Groves
 Regional Councillor Ward 1, 2, 3 Christina Early
 Regional Councillor Ward 4, 5, 6 Mario Russo

Per capita, Caledon has by far the largest representation on Peel Regional Council among the three municipalities.

Climate

Education
The Peel District School Board operates the publicly funded schools in Caledon.  As of 2023, the Board operated 259 school in Peel Region serving 153,000 students. The Dufferin-Peel Catholic District School Board operates Catholic schools for the Region, including Caledon.  As of 2023, the DPCDSB operated 151 schools serving nearly 74,000 students. The Conseil scolaire Viamonde operates secular Francophone schools serving the area. The Conseil scolaire de district catholique Centre-Sud operates Catholic Francophone schools serving the area.

School (Location)

 Allan Drive Middle School (Bolton)
 Alloa Public School (Caledon)
 Alton Public School (Alton)
 Belfountain Public School (Belfountain)
 Brampton Christian School (Private)
 Caledon Central Public School (Caledon Village)
 Caledon East Public School (Caledon East)
 Countryside Montessori and Private School
 Creative Children's Montessori School (Bolton)
 Ellwood Memorial Public School (Bolton)

 Herb Campbell Public School (Campbell's Cross)
 Headwater Hills Montessori School (Private)
 The Hill Academy
 Holy Family Elementary School (Bolton)
 Humberview Secondary School (Bolton)
 Huttonville Public School (Huttonville)
 King's College School (Private)
 James Bolton Public School (Bolton)
 Macville Public School (Bolton)
 Mayfield Secondary School (Caledon)

 Mind Valley Montessori and Private School (Bolton)
 Palgrave Public School (Palgrave)
 St. John Paul II Elementary School (Bolton)
 Robert F. Hall Catholic Secondary School (Caledon East)
 SouthFields Village Public School (Southfields Village)
 St. Cornelius Elementary School (Caledon East)
 St. John the Baptist Elementary School (Bolton)
 St. Nicholas Elementary School (Bolton)
 St Michael Catholic Secondary School (Bolton)
 Tony Pontes Public School (Caledon)

Culture
The Alton Mill Arts Centre is located in located in Caledon.  Art galleries include Headwaters Arts, and Peel Art Gallery, Museum and Archives.

Media
Established in 1888 as the Cardwell Observer, The Caledon Enterprise is published weekly from Bolton by Metroland Media. Also based out of Bolton is The Caledon Citizen, established in 1982. A MELINIUM paper, it is published by Caledon Publishing Ltd. A third newspaper was launched by Rick and Shelly Sargent in 2010: The Regional, published monthly in Bolton. In November 2012, this paper was acquired by Caledon Publishing and ceased publication. The Sargents began working with the Caledon Citizen.

In January 2015 an online publication, specific to Caledon, called JustSayinCaledon.com, was started by former Bolton Ward 5 Regional Councillor Patti Foley. JustSayinCaledon.com publishes stories about local residents and businesses as well as Caledon event listings, Town Council highlights, opinion pieces, and a food section about local markets and restaurants.

A short-lived student-run newspaper, The Caledon Underground, was published in 2010.

The creepypasta 1999 depicts a fictional television station based in Caledon called Caledon Local 21 which was on the air from 1997 until 1999 in the broadcast area of stations in Greater Toronto Area and Hamilton.

Key Porter Books and parent H.B. Fenn are headquartered in Bolton. Broadcast radio stations CJFB-FM and CFGM-FM.

History and trails

Old Township Hall (built c.1875, now used as a theatre) 
Millcroft Inn (woolen mill, built in 1881, now a hotel) 
Alton Mill (woolen mill, c.1881, now an arts centre)
Brick Work Ruins (Caledon)
Bruce Trail (Caledon)
Caledon Trailway (Caledon)
Canadian Heritage Humber River (Caledon)
Elora-Cataract Trail (Caledon)
Grand Valley Trail (Caledon)
Great War Flying Museum (Caledon)
Humber Valley Trail (Caledon)
Andrew's Treasure Trail (Caledon)
Oak Ridges Trail (Caledon)
Hair Pin Turn (Beside the Credit River)
Caledon Central Public School

Organizations 
 Freemasonry
 Caledon Ski Club
 Kinsmen Club Christmas Parade
 Columbian Squires
 Knights of Columbus

Protected areas

 Albion Hills Conservation Area
 Alton Grange Property 
 Belfountain Conservation Area 
 Caledon Lake Forest Conservation Area
 Forks of the Credit Provincial Park
 Glen Haffy Conservation Area
 Ken Whillans Conservation Area
 Palgrave Forest and Wildlife Area
 Robert Baker Forest Conservation Area
 Terra Cotta Conservation Area
 Warwick Conservation Area

Sports and recreation
Junior hockey teams include the Caledon Bombers Caledon Golden Hawks and Caledon Canadians, the latter defunct.

Minor hockey teams include the Caledon Hawks and Caledon Coyotes

Lacrosse in the Town of Caledon is represented by the Caledon Vaughan Minor Lacrosse Association which operates Minor Field and both Minor and Junior C. Box Teams

Mike Fox, the winner of the 2007 Queen's Plate, was foaled in Caledon, while Peaks and Valleys currently stands there.

Caledon Equestrian Park in Palgrave hosted the equestrian events of the 2015 Pan American Games.

Communities
The primary administrative and commercial centre of Caledon is the community of Bolton, which the municipal government estimated as having a population of 26,478 in 2006.

Smaller communities in the town include Albion, Alloa, Alton, Belfountain, Boston Mills, Brimstone (Brimstone Point), Caledon, Caledon East, Caledon Village, Campbell's Cross, Castlederg, Cataract, Cedar Meadows, Cedar Mills, Cheltenham, Claude, Coulterville, Ferndale, Forks of the Credit, The Grange, Humber, Humber Grove, Inglewood, Kilmanagh, Lockton, Mayfield West, Macville, Melville, McLeodville, Mono Mills, Mono Road, New Glasgow, Palgrave, Queensgate, Rockside, Rosehill, Sandhill, Silver Creek, Sleswick, Sligo, Star, Stonehart, Taylorwoods, Terra Cotta, Tormore, Valleywood and Victoria. The region is otherwise very sparsely populated, with farms being the only residential centres.

A number of villages or hamlets have disappeared from the current town:

 Kennedy's Corners (Old School Road and Airport Road)
 Fox's Corners (Willoughby Road and Charleston Side Road)
 Greenlaw (The Grange Sideroad and Winston Churchill Boulevard)
 Caldwell (The Grange Sideroad and Kennedy Road)
 Caldwell Junction (Olde Baseline Road and Moutainview Road)
 Glencoe's Corners (Olde Baseline Road and Creditview Road)
 McBride's Corners (Olde Baseline Road and Hurontario Street)

Infrastructure

Emergency services
The town runs its own fire services through the composite Career and volunteer firefighters of the Town of Caledon Fire & Emergency Services, which has nine stations.

Ambulance services are run by the regional government's Peel Regional Paramedic Services, with three stations (#10, 11 and 12).

Despite being part of Peel Region, policing in Caledon is conducted from Ontario Provincial Police Caledon Detachment rather than Peel Regional Police. OPP also patrols on provincial highways within Caledon (Ontario Highway 9 and Ontario Highway 10).

Transportation

GO Transit operates two bus routes in Caledon:
serving Bolton, Ontario along Peel Regional Road 50 and through east Mississauga connecting with Malton GO Station on the Kitchener line.
serving Orangeville and Brampton connecting with Brampton GO Station on the Georgetown line via Main Street/Highway 10.
It additionally has storage and service facilities in the town.

Selected trips by Brampton Transit's Route 30 Airport Road buses extends into the Tullamore Industrial Area of the Town of Caledon, with a total of six trips per day.

The town has no government-supported local public transit system. However, a growing population prompted former local resident Darren Parberry to start a trial bus service with two routes, called Métis Transit, which ran briefly in 2006. Caledon also ran a commercial bus operation in 1999 under the name Caledon Transit Incorporated, but it ceased operations due to low ridership.

Transit services for the elderly, disabled, and infirm are provided by Caledon Community Services Transportation and Transhelp (run by Peel Region).

Taxi service is also available in the Bolton, Ontario area.

The highways in the municipality are:

 Airport Road or Peel Regional Road 7
 Hurontario Street or Highway 10
 Charleston Sideroad or Peel Regional Road 24 (formerly Highway 24)
 Queen Street or Peel Regional Road 50 (formerly Highway 50)
 Main Street and Porterfield Road, or Peel Regional Road 136 (formerly Highway 136)
 Highway 410 (to Highway 10)

Notable people

See also

 Media in Peel
List of townships in Ontario

References

Notes

External links

 
Lower-tier municipalities in Ontario
Towns in Ontario